The Pusat Bandar Damansara MRT Station, otherwise known as Pavilion Damansara Heights–Pusat Bandar Damansara MRT Station for sponsorship purposes, is a mass rapid transit (MRT) station serving the areas of Damansara Town Centre, Damansara Heights and Bangsar in Kuala Lumpur, Malaysia.

It is one of the stations of the Kajang Line and was opened on 16 December 2016 when Phase One of the line became operational.

Station features

Station location
The station adopts the standard elevated station design for the MRT Sungai Buloh-Kajang Line, with two side platforms above the concourse level. The station is located above the two-level Maarof Interchange of the Sprint Expressway, making it among the highest stations above ground level of the MRT Sungai Buloh-Kajang Line.

The station is located adjacent to the future Pavilion Damansara Heights development and a direct connection is planned between the retail area of the development and the station.

Station layout

Exits and entrances
The station has two entrances: entrance A at the Bangsar-bound slip road on the western side of the Maarof Interchange, and entrance B at the Bangsar and Jalan Johar-bound slip road on the eastern side of the Maarof Interchange. 

Entrance B is currently closed off due to the construction of the upcoming Pavilion Damansara Heights. It will be reconstructed with a new exterior as part of the development.

Feeder bus services

With the opening of the MRT Sungai Buloh-Kajang Line, feeder buses also began operating linking the station with several residential areas in Bukit Damansara and Sri Hartamas as well as the Midvalley Megamall.

The feeder buses operate from the station's feeder bus hub access via Entrance B of the station except T817 in Entrance A. With the closure of Entrance B of the station from August 2021, bus routes T818, T819, T820 and T852 will operate from  Semantan MRT station instead until further notice.

References

External links
 Klang Valley Mass Rapid Transit website
 Pusat Bandar Damansara MRT Station | mrt.com.my

Rapid transit stations in Kuala Lumpur
Sungai Buloh-Kajang Line
Railway stations opened in 2016